Rowland is an English male given name. It is a medieval variation of Roland.

Notable people with the given name "Rowland" include

A
Rowland Abiodun (born 1941), Nigerian-Canadian historian
Rowland K. Adams (1889–1944), American judge
Rowland Allanson-Winn (1855–1935), Irish politician
Rowland Alston (disambiguation), multiple people
Rowland Anderson (1872–1959), Australian politician
Rowland Atkinson, British academic

B
Rowland Bailey (1876–1950), Australian cricketer
Rowland Baring (disambiguation), multiple people
Rowland Barnes (1940–2005), American judge
Rowland Barran (1858–1949), English politician
Rowland Bateman (1737–1803), Irish politician
Rowland Beckett, Australian rugby league footballer
Rowland Berkeley (disambiguation), multiple people
Rowland Berthoff (1921–2001), American historian
Rowland Biffen (1874–1949), British botanist
Rowland Blades (1868–1953), English politician
Rowland Blennerhassett (disambiguation), multiple people
Rowland Bourke (1885–1958), Canadian soldier
Rowland Bowen (1916–1978), English cricket researcher
Rowland Brotherhood (1812–1883), British engineer
Rowland Brotherhood (cricketer) (1841–1938), English cricketer
Rowland Brown (1900–1963), American screenwriter
Rowland Burdon (disambiguation), multiple people

C
Rowland Carter (1875–1916), English architect
Rowland Codling (1880–1954), English footballer
Rowland L. Collins (1935–1985), English professor
Rowland Cotton (1581–1634), English politician
Rowland Croucher (born 1937), Australian pastor

D
Rowland Dawkins (??–1691), Welsh politician
Rowland Davies (disambiguation), multiple people
Rowland L. Davis (1871–1954), American judge
Rowland Robert Teape Davis (1807–1879), New Zealand activist
Rowland Day (1779–1853), American merchant
Rowland Detrosier (1800–1834), English politician

E
Rowland Egerton-Warburton (1804–1891), English landowner
Rowland Ellis (1650–1731), Welsh religious figure
Rowland Ellis (bishop) (1841–1911), Welsh bishop
Rowland Eustace (1505–1578), Irish politician
Rowland Evans (1921–2001), American journalist

F
Rowland Fernyhough (born 1954), British equestrian
Rowland Fisher (1885–1969), English painter
Rowland FitzEustace (1430–1496), Irish judge
Rowland Fraser (1890–1916), Scottish rugby union footballer
Rowland Frazee (1921–2007), Canadian banker
Rowland G. Freeman III (1922–2014), American naval officer

G
Rowland Garrett (born 1950), American basketball player
Rowland George (1905–1997), British rower
Rowland Greenberg (1920–1994), Norwegian musician
Rowland Griffiths (1886–1914), Welsh rugby union footballer
Rowland Gwynne (1658–1728), Welsh politician

H
Rowland Hanson, American corporate executive
Rowland Harrison (1841–1897), English poet
Rowland Harrold (1865–1924), Australian dermatologist
Rowland Hassall (1768–1820), English missionary
Rowland Hayward (1520–1593), English merchant
Rowland Hazard (disambiguation), multiple people
Rowland Heylyn (1562–1631), English merchant
Rowland Hilder (1905–1993), English artist
Rowland Hill (disambiguation), multiple people
Rowland Hodge (1859–1950), English shipbuilder
Rowland Holle (1859–1929), New Zealand cricketer
Rowland Holt (1723–1786), British politician
Rowland Hood (1911–1969), British politician
Rowland S. Howard (1959–2009), Australian musician
Rowland Hughes (1896–1957), American politician
Rowland Hunt (1858–1943), English politician

J
Rowland H. Jackson (1872–1957), American businessman and politician
Rowland Louis Johnston (1872–1939), American politician
Rowland Jones (1722–1774), Welsh lawyer
Rowland Jones (golfer) (1871–1952), English golfer
Rowland Jones-Bateman (1826–1896), English cricketer

K
Rowland C. Kellogg (1843–1911), American politician
Rowland Kenney (1882–1961), British diplomat

L
Rowland Langmaid (1897–1956), British seaman
Rowland Laugharne (1607–1675), Welsh soldier
Rowland Lee (disambiguation), multiple people
Rowland Leigh (1902–1963), English screenwriter
Rowland Leigh (MP) (??–1603), English politician
Rowland Lockey (1565–1616), English painter
Rowland Lytton (1615–1674), English politician

M
Rowland Hussey Macy (1822–1877), American businessman
Rowland B. Mahany (1864–1937), American politician
Rowland Mainwaring (1850–1926), British army officer
Rowland Makati (born 2001), Kenyan footballer
Rowland Ap Meredydd (1529–1600), Welsh politician
Rowland Meyrick (1505–1566), Welsh bishop
Rowland Molony (born 1946), British poet
Rowland Money-Kyrle (1866–1928), English archdeacon
Rowland Percy Moss, American economist
Rowland Musson (1912–1943), English cricketer

N
Rowland Needham (1878–1963), English cricketer
Rowland Nugent (1861–1948), English naval officer

O
Rowland Office (born 1952), American baseball player
Rowland Mason Ordish (1824–1886), English engineer

P
Rowland Parker (1912–1989), English historian
Rowland Pennington (1870–1929), English footballer
Rowland Perkins (1934–2018), American talent agent
Rowland Pettit (1927–1981), Australian-American chemist
Rowland Phillips (disambiguation), multiple people
Rowland Plumbe (1838–1919), English architect
Rowland Powell-Williams (1872–1951), English cricketer
Rowland Prichard (1811–1887), Welsh musician
Rowland Prothero (1851–1937), British politician
Rowland Pugh (1579–??), Welsh politician

R
Rowland Raw (1884–1915), English cricketer
Rowland Rees (1840–1904), Australian architect
Rowland Henry Rerick (1857-1925) American newspaper publisher and historian
Rowland Rivron (born 1958), British comedian
Rowland Richard Robbins (1872–1960), English farmer
Rowland Robinson (1833–1900), American farmer
Rowland Ryder (1914–1996), English schoolmaster

S
Rowland Salley (born 1949), American musician
Rowland Scherman (born 1937), American photographer
Rowland Searchfield (1565–1622), English bishop
Rowland Shaddick (1920–1994), English cricketer
Rowland Smith (1826–1901), English politician
Rowland Southern (1882–1935), English biologist
Rowland Sperling (1874–1965), British diplomat
Rowland Stephenson (disambiguation), multiple people
Rowland St John (1588–1645), English politician
Rowland Suddaby (1912–1972), British artist
Rowland Sutherland, British musician

T
Rowland Talbot, British screenwriter
Rowland Taylor (1510–1555), English religious figure
Rowland Thomas (1621–1698), English colonist
Rowland E. Trowbridge (1821–1881), American politician

V
Rowland Vaughan (disambiguation), multiple people
Rowland Venables (1846–1920), English cricketer

W
Rowland Ward (1848–1912), British taxidermist
Rowland White (disambiguation), multiple people
Rowland Whitehead (disambiguation), multiple people
Rowland Whyte (??–1626), English businessman
Rowland Williams (disambiguation), multiple people
Rowland Wilson (disambiguation), multiple people
Rowland Winn (disambiguation), multiple people
Rowland Winter (born 1985), British rugby union coach
Rowland Wolfe (1914–2010), American gymnast
Rowland Worsley (1907–??), Australian politician
Rowland Wright (1915–1991), British industrialist

Y
Rowland York (??–1588), English soldier

See also
Rowland (disambiguation), a disambiguation page for "Rowland"
Rowland (surname), a page for people with the surname "Rowland"

References

English masculine given names